DHK Zora Olomouc is a women's handball club from Olomouc, Czech Republic.

Results

National
Czech First Division:
Gold: 2003, 2004, 2008

References

External links
 Official website 

Czech handball clubs
Handball clubs established in 1919
Sport in Olomouc